University of Phoenix (UoPX) is a private for-profit university headquartered in Phoenix, Arizona. Founded in 1976, the university confers certificates and degrees at the certificate, associate, bachelor's, master's, and doctoral degree levels. It is institutionally accredited by the Higher Learning Commission and has an open enrollment admissions policy for many undergraduate programs. The school is currently owned by Apollo Global Management and Vistria Group, two US private-equity firms, but is in the process of being sold.

History

Foundation and rapid growth (1970s - 2000s)
University of Phoenix was founded in 1976 by John Sperling and John D. Murphy. In 1980, it expanded to San Jose, California, and launched its online program in 1989. Much of UoPX's revenue came from employers who were subsidizing the higher education of their managers. Academic labor underwent a process of unbundling, in which "various components of the traditional faculty role (e.g., curriculum design) are divided among different entities, while others (e.g., research) are eliminated altogether".

In 1994, UoPX leaders made the parent company, Apollo Group, public. Its enrollment exceeded 100,000 students by 1999. Senator Tom Harkin, who chaired hearings on for-profit colleges, said, "I think what really turned this company is when they started going to Wall Street." The sentiment was echoed by Murphy in his book Mission Forsaken: The University of Phoenix Affair with Wall Street. In 2004, Murphy thought that "the University of Phoenix abandoned its founding mission of solely serving working adult learners to admit virtually anyone with a high school diploma or GED." In terms of revenue, UoPX began to rely less on corporate assistance and more on government funding. In 2007, The New York Times reported that the school's graduation rate had plummeted and that educational quality had eroded.

In 2000, the federal government fined the university $6 million for including study-group meetings as instructional hours. In 2002, the Department of Education relaxed requirements on instructional hours.

A 2003 lawsuit filed by two former university recruiters alleged that the school improperly obtained hundreds of millions of dollars in financial aid by paying its admission counselors based on the number of students they enrolled, a violation of the Higher Education Act. The university's parent company settled by paying the government $67.5 million, plus $11 million in legal fees, without admitting any wrongdoing.

In 2004, the Department of Education alleged that UoPX violated Higher Education Act provisions that prohibit financial incentives to admission representatives, and pressured its recruiters to enroll students. UoPX disputed the findings but paid a $9.8 million fine as part of a settlement where it admitted no wrongdoing and was not required to return any financial aid funds. The university also paid $3.5 million to the Department of Labor to settle a violation of overtime compensation regarding hours worked by UoPX's recruiters. UoPX settled a false claims suit for $78.5 million in 2009 over its recruiter-pay practices.

In 2008, Pereira & O'Dell became the lead ad agency for UoPX for a reported $220 million. During the 2008–2009 fiscal year, the UoPX student body received more Pell Grant money ($656.9 million) than any other university and was the top recipient of student financial aid funds, receiving almost $2.48 billion.

For the 2008–2009 fiscal year, the university's student body received more Pell Grant money than any other university. The university's graduation rate was 17 percent, according to federal data that measures first-time, full-time (FTFT) undergraduate students who complete their programs at 150% of the normal time. University of Phoenix has been the largest recipient of federal G.I. Bill tuition benefits and the largest for-profit recipient by Pell Grant assistance funding.

In 2009, the Department of Education produced a report claiming the untimely return of unearned Title IV funds for more than 10 percent of sampled students. The report also expressed concern that some students register and begin attending classes before completely understanding the implications of enrollment, including their eligibility for student financial aid. In January 2010, the parent company Apollo Group was required to post a letter of credit for $125 million by January 30 of the same year. In 2010, UoPX came under government scrutiny after its Phoenix and Philadelphia campuses were found to have engaged in deceptive enrollment practices and fraudulent solicitation of FAFSA funds.

Enrollment decline (2010s)
In 2010, UoPX claimed a peak enrollment of more than 470,000 students with a revenue of $4.95 billion. A 2010 report found that its online graduation rate at the time was only five percent. Later in the year, the university paid $154.5 million for 20-year naming rights for advertising purposes of the University of Phoenix Stadium in Glendale, Arizona. The company terminated the naming rights deal on April 11, 2017, and on September 4, 2018, the stadium's naming rights were acquired by State Farm. 

In August 2010, an ABC News investigation identified a UoPX recruiter who sought new students from Y-Haven, a homeless shelter in Cleveland, Ohio. Another University of Phoenix recruiter falsely claimed that the university's Bachelor of Science in Education degree would be sufficient to qualify the producer to teach in Texas or New York.

In a December 2010 Bloomberg article, former UoPX senior vice president Robert W. Tucker noted that "at critical junctures, [co-founder] John [Sperling] chose growth over academic integrity, which ultimately diminished a powerful educational model". At its peak, UoPX operated more than 500 campuses and learning sites. The university began to focus on opening new resource centers for online students to provide spaces for alumni to network and current students to seek assistance from professors and peers.

In August 2011, Apollo group announced it would buy 100% of Carnegie Learning to accelerate its efforts to incorporate adaptive learning into its academic platform. Controversies concerned its marketing and recruitment practices, instructional hours, its status as one of the top recipients of student aid, and a student body carrying the most student debt of any college.

In 2013, the Department of Defense ended its contract with University of Phoenix for military bases in Europe. U.S. military commanders at Fort Campbell, Kentucky, allowed UoPX representatives to advertise and place promotional materials in high-traffic areas. Access was provided in exchange for cash. Some critics of for-profit higher education have alleged that Apollo Education Group and University of Phoenix "prey upon veterans".

Murphy wrote in Mission Forsaken (2013) about the school's degeneration from a provider of working adult continuing education programs to a money making machine whose sole criterion for admission was eligibility for federally funded student loans.

In 2014 the Department of Education's Office of the Inspector General demanded records from the school and Apollo Group going back to 2007 "related to marketing, recruitment, enrollment, financial aid, fraud prevention, [and] student retention". In the same year, Arthur Green, a former UoPX enrollment advisor, sued the school and claimed that it had violated the US False Claims Act. According to Green, he was fired for uncovering billions of dollars in fraud. Five years later, the case was dismissed in 2019 after the US Department of Justice under William Barr decided not to take the case and the records were sealed.

In 2014, UoPX partnered with 47 historically black colleges and universities to offer UoPX classes that transfer to these institutions. 142,500 students enrolled on August 31, 2016, and 119,938 during the 2016–17 school year. UoPX was under investigation by the US Federal Trade Commission from 2015 to 2020. During this time, the university continued to spend tens of millions of dollars on marketing and advertising, including $27 million on internet paid search advertising. The Brookings Institution reported that UoPX spent $76 million on advertising in 2017.

From 2009 to 2015, University of Phoenix received an estimated $1.2 billion of federal money issued through the G.I. Bill. The university enrolled almost 50,000 such students in 2014, twice as many as any other institution.

In October 2015, the Department of Defense suspended the school's ability to recruit on U.S. military bases and receive federal funding for educating members of the U.S. military. Some federal legislators, including senators John McCain, Jeff Flake, and Lamar Alexander, protested the suspension, which was lifted in January 2016.

The Federal Trade Commission (FTC) began investigating the university in 2015 in regards to an advertising campaign it ran from 2012 to 2014.  On December 10, 2019, UoPX agreed to pay a settlement of $191 million related to charges that it recruited students using misleading advertisements.  NPR reported the amount included $50 million in cash, as well as a $141 million cancellation in student debt, though the cancellations "won't affect student borrowers' obligations for federal or private loans".  The institution admitted no wrongdoing as part of the settlement, which was at the time the largest FTC settlement against a for-profit school.

In 2015, MarketWatch reported that UoPX students owed more than $35 billion in student loan debt, the most of any US college at the time.

In February 2016, Apollo Group announced its sale to a private investment group comprising Apollo Global Management, the Vistria Group, and the Najafi Companies, for $1 billion. Former U.S. Department of Education deputy secretary Anthony W. Miller, partner and chief operating officer of Vistria, became chairman. The sale was approved by both the Department of Education and the Higher Learning Commission (HLC). In December 2016, the U.S. Department of Education approved of the sale of Apollo Education Group to Apollo Global Management. The company provided a letter of credit for up to $385 million. In February 2017, after the takeover by Apollo Global Management, UoPX laid off 170 full-time faculty members. In 2019, former UoPX students, represented by Harvard Law School's Project on Predatory Student Lending, were part of a lawsuit against the Department of Education, demanding student loan forgiveness. Education Department officials cited pending litigation as a reason why they have not approved or denied any of the borrower defense claims. According to the 2019 academic report, degreed enrollment was 87,400.

In 2016, Apollo Education Group shareholders filed a class-action lawsuit against the corporation, arguing that it withheld information leading to large losses in stock prices. Several of the allegations related to UoPX's recruiting of military personnel and veterans.

Between 2010 and 2016, enrollment declined by more than 70 percent amid multiple investigations, lawsuits, and controversies.

Apollo Global Management and Vistria Group (2017-present)
In March 2020, the U.S. Department of Veterans Affairs (VA) announced that they had suspended certification for G.I. Bill funds for new students at UoPX, citing a history of deceptive recruiting practices.
 The VA withdrew its threat of sanctions in July 2020. The same year, UoPX received $6.5 million in CARES Act funding and $7.4 million in the second round of COVID-19 relief funds. In 2020, UoPX began experimenting with micro-campuses, giving the centers a "WeWork vibe".

In 2021, the Federal Trade Commission began distributing checks to more than 100,000 former students who were enrolled from 2012 to 2016 when UoPX was using deceptive advertising. In 2021, Bloomberg reported that Apollo's higher education investment had gained about 50 percent in value: from its $634 million initial investment to $956 million. UoPX also received $3.4 million in aid through the American Rescue Plan. In 2021, UoPX continued to close campuses, including Atlanta and Salt Lake City. The Phoenix, Arizona campus was the only location accepting new in-person students. Lobbyists for Apollo Education, UoPX's parent company, were reduced from 27 in 2018 to 10 in 2021. By mid-2021, discussions were held for the sale of the school.

In 2022, UoPX announced that only one campus would remain open in 2025.

In 2023, it was announced that UoPX was holding discussions with the University of Arkansas System about the latter possibly purchasing UoPX. Later, it was learned that the proposed deal would include Wolters Kluwer, a Dutch publishing company, as the registered agent.  An unknown Japanese bank was also reportedly involved in financing the potential deal.Stephens Inc. was also involved in the negotiations.

Academics
UoPX has an open admissions policy by which most of its undergraduate programs accessible to anyone with a high school diploma, GED, or their equivalent. Prior to 2010, the university recruited students using high-pressure sales tactics, including assertions that classes were filling fast, by admissions counselors who are paid, in part, based on their success in recruiting students. The university recruits students and obtains financial aid on their behalf, such as the Academic Competitiveness Grant, Federal Pell Grant, National Science & Mathematics Access to Retain Talent Grant (National SMART Grant), Federal Direct Student Loan Program, Federal Supplemental Educational Opportunity Grant, Federal Direct PLUS Loans, Federal Perkins Loan, and the Wounded Warrior Project. In the 2017–18 award year, 51,990 UoPX received the Federal Pell Grant.

Besides postsecondary degree-level programs, the school offers continuing education courses for teachers and practitioners, professional development courses for companies, and specialized courses of study for military personnel. Students spend 20 to 24 hours with an instructor during each course, and are required to collaborate on learning team projects.

Students have access to class-specific online resources, which include an electronic library of textbooks and other course materials. Some academics and former students argue the abbreviated courses and the use of learning teams result in an inferior education. UoPX has been criticized for lack of academic rigor; Henry M. Levin, a professor of higher education at Teachers College at Columbia University, called its business degree an "MBA Lite", saying "I've looked at [its] course materials. It's a very low level of instruction." The university's "corporate articulation agreements" provide an alternative assessment program for people working at other companies to earn college credit for training they have completed at their jobs. To qualify for college credit, students either write an "experiential essay" or create a professional training portfolio, the latter of which is a collection of documents such as transcripts from other schools, certificates, licenses, workshops or seminars.

UoPX has been regionally accredited since 1978 by the HLC. In February 2013, a peer review group recommended to the HLC that the university be put on probation because it "has insufficient autonomy relative to its parent corporation". On May 9, 2013, the Apollo Group filed a report with the Securities and Exchange Commission which stated that the HLC Institutional Actions Council First Committee (IACFC) had recommended to the HLC that the university retain its regional accreditation, but that the university be placed on "notice" for two years. Their concerns centered on the university's governance, student assessment, and faculty scholarship in relation to Ph.D. programs. In July 2015, the HLC removed University of Phoenix from Notice Status.

University of Phoenix has 18 programs with business, healthcare, nursing, counseling and education having programmatic or specialized accreditation. Some individual colleges within University of Phoenix hold specialty accreditation or are pre-accredited by accrediting agencies that are recognized by the Council for Higher Education Accreditation.
 School of Business accreditation through the Accreditation Council for Business Schools and Programs (ACBSP) including an Associate of Arts with a concentration in accounting or business fundamentals, a Bachelor of Science in business, a Master of Business Administration and a Doctor of Management. Because UoPX's business programs are not accredited by the Association to Advance Collegiate Schools of Business (AACSB), some companies will not provide tuition reimbursement for employees attending the university.
 College of Education Master of Arts in Education for Elementary, Secondary and Special Education as well as a Master of Arts in Administration and Supervision is accredited by the Teacher Education Accreditation Council.
 College of Nursing B.S. and M.S. degree programs are accredited by the Commission on Collegiate Nursing Education. Graduates are eligible to take the National Council Licensure Examination, which is required in order to become a practicing registered nurse. Degrees in programs for medical, public health and health administration professionals are accredited by the Commission on Accreditation of Healthcare Management Education iMaster of Health Administration.
 College of Social SciencesThe Master of Science in Counseling program in Community Counseling (Phoenix and Tucson campuses only), the Master of Science in Counseling program in Mental Health Counseling (Utah campuses only), and the Master of Science in Counseling program in Clinical Mental Health Counseling (Phoenix and Tucson campuses only) are accredited by the Council for Accreditation of Counseling and Related Educational Programs.

Rankings
UoPX was ranked 386th out of 391 schools in the 2021 Washington Monthly list of national universities. The university is ranked #331-440 in the 2022 edition of the U.S. News & World Report National Universities.

Ownership and leadership
UoPX is a wholly-owned subsidiary of Apollo Global Management. The president is Chris Lynne and the chief academic officer is John Woods.

Student demographics
According to the College Scorecard, the University of Phoenix student body's ethnic composition is 39 percent unknown, 26 percent white, 20 percent black, 11 percent Hispanic, 2 percent multiracial, with 1 percent each for Asian, American Indian/Alaska Native and Native Hawaiian/Pacific Islander . The 2020 Academic Annual Report for UoPX indicated women make up two-thirds of the student body, the average student age is 37, and more than 83 percent of its students are employed while in school.  The 2020 report also noted that 21% of the student body were affiliated with the military, of which 41% are women. 26% of 2020 graduates were military-affiliated graduates.

In 2020–21, 1,316 students used Department of Defense Tuition Assistance and 7,380 students used G.I. Bill funds. University of Phoenix has been a partner of U.S. Army University and has had a presence at a few military bases.

Faculty
The institution depends almost entirely on contingent faculty: about 97 percent of Phoenix instructors teach part-time, compared to 47 percent nationwide. This reliance on part-time faculty has been criticized by regulators and academic critics. Most of the classes are centrally crafted and standardized to ensure consistency and to maximize profits. No faculty members get tenure. Adjuncts earn approximately $1000–$2000 per course. Approximately 21 cents of every tuition dollar is spent on instruction.

According to the Integrated Postsecondary Education Data System, the student to faculty ratio is 92 to 1 in the Arizona segment. The university reported 76 full-time and 3,143 part-time faculty in its Arizona segment; full-time faculty make up 2 percent of the total faculty.

Student outcomes
In 2016, a Brookings Institution study estimated University of Phoenix's five-year student loan default rate at 47 percent. The College Navigator lists University of Phoenix's overall graduation rate at 15 percent. According to the College Scorecard, of student debtors two years into repayment, 32 percent were in forbearance, 28 percent were not making progress, 13 percent were in deferment, 11 percent defaulted, 7 percent were making progress, 5 percent were delinquent, 2 percent were paid in full, and 1 percent were discharged.

Alumni and affiliations

Phoenix alumni in the government sector include Howard Schmidt, Mary Peters (1994), and Brad Dee (1991). In the private sector, alumni include former MBA Chair at the Forbes School of Business & Technology and radio host Diane Hamilton. In military and law enforcement, alumni include Kirkland H. Donald and Harold Hurtt (1991). Former MSNBC anchor and a host of NBC's Early Today Christina Brown is also an alumna of the university.

Athletes who have earned degrees from the university include Shaquille O'Neal (2005), Lisa Leslie, Michael Russell (2012), and Larry Fitzgerald (2016). Fitzgerald graduated with a bachelor's degree shortly before his 33rd birthday (he began college in 2002 at the University of Pittsburgh) and was a spokesman for UoPX.

Several American policymakers have been affiliated with University of Phoenix and Apollo Education. Former secretary of the Department of Education, Margaret Spellings, is a member of the Apollo Group Board of Directors. Jane Oates, a former staffer for Senator Ted Kennedy and the Department of Labor, became the Apollo Group's vice president for external relations in 2013. Nancy Pelosi's close friendship with Sperling has been documented by Suzanne Mettler in Degrees of Inequality. University of Phoenix has community partnerships with Boys and Girls Clubs of America, the American Red Cross, and the Junior League. In 2016, University of Phoenix partnered with the ASIS Foundation to provide scholarships for students studying for security-related degrees. In March 2016, the first ten scholarship recipients were announced. In 2017, the Vistria Group was part of the deal with Apollo Global Management to take over the schools. Vistria included two friends of Barack Obama: Miller and Martin Nesbitt. In 2019, the Apollo Education Group was the third largest higher education lobby, and has 18 lobbyists at the federal level. In 2021, UoPX demanded that the Republican Attorneys General Association refund a donation of more than $50,000 after the organization was allegedly involved in instigating the 2021 United States Capitol attack.

Notes

References

External links 

 Official website
 "College, Inc.", PBS Frontline documentary, May 4, 2010

 
Educational institutions established in 1976
For-profit universities and colleges in the United States
University of Phoenix
1976 establishments in Arizona